Rodrigo Bessone Basto Junior (29 March 1919 – c. 2005) was a Portuguese water polo player. He competed in the men's tournament at the 1952 Summer Olympics.

References

1919 births
2005 deaths
Portuguese male water polo players
Olympic water polo players of Portugal
Water polo players at the 1952 Summer Olympics
Sportspeople from Lisbon